Hole in the Wall was an Australian television game show hosted by Jules Lund, based on the Japanese game show Brain Wall. In the show, contestants are required to fit though holes in a polystyrene wall that moves towards them.

Produced by FremantleMedia, the show began airing on the Nine Network from 6 August 2008.

Format
The show follows a similar format as the British version, and uses the same music package.

Each episode features two teams consisting of three celebrity contestants, with each team competing for a charity. The contestants, fitted with hard hats and spandex, stand on a rectangular strip called the "Play Area" as a polystyrene wall moves towards them. The aim is to assume a position that will best allow their bodies to fit through a shape or a number of shapes cut into the wall.

The game consists of four rounds plus a final round that decides the winner. The first round has three contestants on the strip. A point is awarded to each contestant who fits through the hole. The second round has two contestants. For two points to be awarded, both contestants must fit through the hole.

The third round is variable in the number of players and the scenario played, differing in each episode. For example, scenarios have included facing the wall blindfolded, being forced to rely on the studio audience to guide a contestant, and facing the wall with either a prop or a guest contestant. These guests have included members of the audience and Jules Lund himself. The fourth round sees all three contestants having to face a wall traveling at double speed. Five points are awarded if all contestants fit through the hole, but otherwise no points are scored.

The last round has the team with the most points being given the choice of either facing the wall or forcing the other team to do so. In the event of a tie, a coin toss determines which team has control. The winner is based on the success of the team that is chosen to face the wall. This brings up controversy since all the points accumulated are worth nothing and the winner of the last round wins the whole show.

The winning team at end of the show wins a trophy and  AU$10,000 for their chosen charity.

Catchphrase
"It's time to face the wall!"

Episodes

Production

Casting

The search for a host for Hole in the Wall was tough for producers, with a late withdrawal of the hosting job meaning another search had to be made in the last weeks before recordings began. Quite a number of personalities had auditioned for the hosting role, including Colin Lane, Jason Dundas, Jules Lund, Shura Taft and Dan O'Connor. It was believed that Shura Taft had landed the job when he was in the hosting role for early recordings of the show. Taft was in fact a stand-in host for early production shoots to trial the shows' format while producers were still finding a suitable host. Lund was eventually named as the host, several weeks after actual recordings were scheduled to start.

Filming

Hole in the Wall began recording episodes in mid-May 2008, after being delayed from late April 2008 at Melbourne Central City Studios at the Docklands. The pre-show buzz was highlighted when bigger studio audiences than anticipated turned up at the first shoots and some had to be turned away. The later episodes' audience numbers were adjusted to cater for the overwhelming demand.

References

External links
Hole in the Wall official website
Hole in the Wall official YouTube site
 

Nine Network original programming
2008 Australian television series debuts
2008 Australian television series endings
2000s Australian game shows
English-language television shows
Television series by Fremantle (company)
Television shows set in Melbourne
Australian television series based on Japanese television series